Dr Prasanna Gunasena is a consultant neurosurgeon attached to Lanka Hospitals in Sri Lanka. He is also the Chairman of State Pharmaceutical Company (SPC) of Sri Lanka.

Early life and education
Gunasena was educated at Nalanda College Colombo. He holds MBBS, MS Fellowship of the Royal College of Surgeons (Edinburgh) and also a Spinal Fellow (Canada).

Career
He holds the honour of performing the surgery for cervical disc prolapse of the spine and replacement with functional discs for the first time in Sri Lanka. Gunasena is the first Sri Lankan Neurosurgeon to perform Balloon Kyphoplasty surgery for spinal code fractures.

Gunasena was a founding member of the Neurosurgeons Association of Sri Lanka (NSASL).

References 

 Rs 23 b due to pharma firms to be settled soon
 

 

 

 

 

 

 

 

 

Sri Lankan surgeons
Alumni of Nalanda College, Colombo
Sri Lankan Buddhists